Ernest Woodrow Pannell (February 2, 1917 – September 24, 1998) was a player in the National Football League. He was drafted by the Green Bay Packers in the sixteenth round of the 1941 NFL Draft and played three seasons with the team.

References

1917 births
1998 deaths
People from Travis County, Texas
Green Bay Packers players
Texas A&M Aggies football players
American football offensive tackles